Salla Union is a union of Kalihati Upazila, Tangail District, Bangladesh. It is situated 21 km north of Tangail, The District Headquarter.

Demographics

According to Population Census 2011 performed by Bangladesh Bureau of Statistics, The total population of Salla union is 19916. There are 4798 households in total.

Education

The literacy rate of Salla Union is 38.2% (Male-40.9%, Female-35.6%).

See also
 Union Councils of Tangail District

References

Populated places in Dhaka Division
Populated places in Tangail District
Unions of Kalihati Upazila